One-way interview, also known as asynchronous interview, pre recorded interview, virtual interview or digital interview, enables prospective employers to conduct online video interviews in an automated fashion. The interviews are conducted via websites or internet-enabled devices which use digital interviewing applications.

One-way interviewing is becoming the standard method for first round of screening providing interviewers with an efficient, fair, and structured method for conducting interviews. It utilizes technology to equip hiring personnel to interview candidates who are short of time and could not do a traditional face-to-face interview because of large number of applications, or candidates that align with a prospective position that may be a full or part-time remote work opportunity. These types of interview make the recruitment process more efficient and discovering employable talent easier. Interview candidates that are used to traditional face-to-face interviews may find one-way interviewing unusual due to the lack of verbal and non-verbal feedback during the one-way interview process and may utilize third-party software to replicate the one-way interview process to practice and receive feedback on their performance.

Interview process 
The interviewer creates questions in text or audio format, records their interview questions, or prepares sample scenarios/coding challenges for the online interview. The interviewer invites candidates for the online interview via email. The candidate opens the link to the online interview in a web browser or mobile application and then records their responses. The candidate reads and then answers each question using a webcam, mobile phone camera or other device that gathers audio and video. The interviewers reviews the answers and grades candidates. Finally, the interviewer invites the selected candidates for the face-to-face interview.

Traditional interviews and one-way interviewing 
Traditional interviews continue to be the top choice of many individuals, but many employers are moving to video interview platforms. As the prevalence of remote work positions, technology, and telecommuting continue to increase/improve, virtual interviews become a more acceptable method for identifying ideal hires. As digital profiles and websites such as LinkedIn, play a larger role in hiring, digital interviewing becomes more aligned with the existing relationships between employment candidates and employers. Candidates can attend or record the digital interview wherever suits them from an internet cafe to a room in their home or current office to complete the interview. However, research suggests that signal distortion (including technical issues, environmental issues, and non-verbal communication issues) all can affect the outcome of a one-way interview. This can be mitigated by allowing candidates to submit their responses multiple times or by giving them the correct training for taking video interviews

References